Liebau may refer to:

Places
Minihof-Liebau, Austria
The German name for Lubawka, Poland

People with the surname
Carol Platt Liebau, attorney, political analyst and commentator based near Los Angeles

See also 
 Libau (disambiguation)